The Royal World is a reality television series which debuted on MTV International in November 2018. The show was announced in July 2018 as a six-episode, hour-long program produced by Initial, part of the Endemol Shine Group. The executive producers are Orr Barker and Iestyn Barker of MTV, and Andrew Jackman of Initial. The show was filmed in the United Kingdom and features its cast members living together "for one summer in the English countryside".

Cast
The Royal World is hosted by Archie Manners, a professional magician. It features a cast of ten men and women who claim to be members of royal or noble families, or somehow acquainted with members of royal or noble families.

Notes

References

2018 British television series debuts
2018 British television series endings
2010s British reality television series
English-language television shows
MTV reality television series